Brice H. Hunter (April 21, 1974 – April 19, 2004) was an American football wide receiver in the National Football League (NFL). He was drafted by the Miami Dolphins in the seventh round of the 1996 NFL Draft with the 251st overall pick. He played college football at Georgia.

Death
Hunter was shot and killed outside of his Chicago apartment in 2004.

References

External links

1974 births
2004 deaths
People from Coconut Creek, Florida
Players of American football from Florida
American football wide receivers
Georgia Bulldogs football players
Tampa Bay Buccaneers players
Deaths by firearm in Illinois
Male murder victims
People murdered in Illinois
American murder victims
2004 murders in the United States
Sportspeople from Broward County, Florida